Tere Bina may refer to:
 Tere Bina (song)
 Tere Bina (TV series)